Francis J. Caprice (born April 2, 1962) is a Canadian former professional ice hockey goaltender who spents parts of six seasons with the Vancouver Canucks of the National Hockey League in the 1980s. After his time with the Canucks Caprice played mainly in Italy and the United Kingdom, retiring in 1999.

Playing career
Caprice was Vancouver's ninth round selection (178th overall) in the 1981 NHL Entry Draft. In the year following his selection, he improved his stock greatly, winning 24 games for the London Knights and representing Canada at the 1982 World Junior Championships. He won all three of his starts at the World Juniors, helping Canada to the gold medal. Following the season, he signed with the Canucks and turned pro.

Caprice spent most of his first pro season in the AHL, although he did make his NHL debut, playing the 3rd period in a blowout to the Los Angeles Kings. Caprice's big opportunity came in the 1983–84, when the Canucks' starting goalie Richard Brodeur was injured. In his starting debut against the Edmonton Oilers on Hockey Night in Canada, Caprice earned first-star honours in a 3-2 Canucks victory. He posted a solid 8-8-1 mark with a 3.34 GAA, the best performance of any of the three Canuck goalies that year.

Based on his fine performance in 1983–84, Caprice was given a chance to usurp Brodeur as the Canucks' starter in 1984–85, although he struggled and then tore his hamstring, causing him to miss three months of action. He finished the season with an 8-14-3 mark and 4.81 GAA in 28 appearances, and never seriously challenged for the #1 spot again.

In 1985–86, Caprice again struggled, posting an 0-3-2 record and terrible 5.45 GAA in 7 appearances, and was demoted to the AHL in favour of Wendell Young. However, he reclaimed the backup job in 1986–87, and posted a 3.84 GAA in 25 appearances, his best since his rookie year. In 1987–88, he appeared in 22 games backing up 21-year-old Kirk McLean as the aging Brodeur was relegated to 11 appearances.

In 1988–89, Caprice was relegated to the IHL as the Canucks decided to go with a goaltending tandem of McLean and Steve Weeks. For the 1989–90 season, Caprice was dealt to the Boston Bruins for a ninth round pick. However, he spent the entire season in the minors and was released at the end of the year.

Following his release from the Bruins, Caprice spent most of the 1990s playing in Italy and later in Britain with the Cardiff Devils, before retiring in 1999 and returning to his hometown of Hamilton. He came out of retirement in 2001 to represent the Dundas, Ontario team at the 2001 Allan Cup.

In 1993, Caprice played for the Vancouver VooDoo of Roller Hockey International.

Caprice appeared in 102 NHL games over 6 NHL seasons, posting a 31-46-11 record with a 4.19 GAA and one shutout.

Career statistics

Regular season and playoffs

External links

References

1962 births
Living people
Ayr Scottish Eagles players
Canadian ice hockey goaltenders
Cardiff Devils players
Dallas Black Hawks players
Fredericton Express players
Ice hockey people from Ontario
Sportspeople from Hamilton, Ontario
London Knights players
Maine Mariners players
Milwaukee Admirals (IHL) players
HC Gardena players
Vancouver Canucks draft picks
Vancouver Canucks players
Vancouver VooDoo players
Canadian sportspeople of Italian descent
Canadian expatriate ice hockey players in Scotland
Canadian expatriate ice hockey players in Wales
Canadian expatriate ice hockey players in Italy
Canadian expatriate ice hockey players in the United States